Trihedral Engineering Limited (Trihedral) is a Bedford, Nova Scotia, Canadabased creator of industrial automation software. The VTScada SCADA platform is the company's main product.

Trihedral's customers are in industries including fresh water and wastewater, subsea and terrestrial oil production, air traffic management monitoring systems, fire station and 911 emergency alerting systems, national broadcast networks, marine systems, manufacturing, and food & beverage.

Trihedral has offices in Nova Scotia, Florida, Alberta, Alabama, California, Michigan, Texas and Scotland.

VTScada
VTScada is both a Human Machine Interface (HMI), and a Supervisory Control and Data Acquisition (SCADA) software package. Functionally, VTScada includes real-time monitoring and control, telemetry, alarm and events management, alarm notification, data acquisition, reporting, trending, mapping, application version control, Internet and mobile access.

VTScada communicates with programmable logic controllers (PLCs), Remote Terminal Units (RTUs), pump controllers and other devices using radio, LAN, WAN, cellular, or phone lines. This information is logged and displayed to users on a computer screen via trend graphs, reports, or graphical display pages. The software can also send control signals back to the devices to control the process.

The VTScada software is used by nearly 900 municipalities across the United States, and thousands of industrial customers globally. Notable uses of the software include:
 An estimated one-third of drilled North Sea oil is controlled by VTScada
 The City of Sacramento, California uses VTScada for monitoring and control of its fresh and wastewater infrastructure, with a license that supports up to 500,000 data points
 Toyota uses VTScada to control its Kentucky assembly plant
 Shannon Airport in Shannon, Ireland, and Halifax Stanfield International Airport in Halifax, Canada use the software to control their customs systems
 The Miami Dade County, Florida Water and Sewer Department uses VTScada in their stormwater management system, to monitor up to 500,000 data points

History
Glenn Wadden founded Trihedral in 1986. In 1988, the company released “WEB”; one of the first PC-based SCADA packages that ran on the DOS platform. Trihedral briefly trademarked the term "WEB" in 1990, before the Internet's widespread proliferation.  In 1998, Trihedral Engineering Limited opened a 100% wholly owned subsidiary, Trihedral UK, in Aberdeen, Scotland. In 1997, WEB became Visual Tag System (VTS) and was updated to run on the Windows operating system.  By 2007, Trihedral had developed VTScada, an integrated toolset of telemetry features designed for the water and wastewater industry.  The same year, Trihedral, Inc., opened in Orlando, Florida.

Awards
 In 2015, Control Engineering (magazine) was named VTScada winner of the Control Engineering Engineer’s Choice award in the HMI Software category. 
 Canada's Top 100 Employers ranked Trihedral among Nova Scotia’s Top Employers from 2007 to 2013.

References

External links

 Industrial automation software